Robert Smith, better known by his stage name Rob Sonic, is an American rapper and record producer from the Bronx, New York. He has been a member of the groups Sonic Sum and Hail Mary Mallon. He is a founder of the record label Skypimps Music.

Biography
Rob Sonic is originally from Washington, D.C. As a child, he moved to New York. He started rapping at age 12.

In 2011, Smith released the album Are You Gonna Eat That? on Rhymesayers Entertainment with Aesop Rock and DJ Big Wiz under the alias Hail Mary Mallon. The group's second album, Bestiary, was released in 2014 on the same label.

In 2004, he released his debut solo studio album, Telicatessen, on Definitive Jux. In 2007, he released Sabotage Gigante on the label. He released Alice in Thunderdome in 2014, Defriender in 2018, and Latrinalia in 2021.

Discography

Studio albums
 Telicatessen (2004)
 Sabotage Gigante (2007)
 Alice in Thunderdome (2014)
 Defriender (2018)
 Latrinalia (2021)

Compilation albums
 Barf (2017)

Singles
 "Death Vendor" / "Dylsexia" (2004)
 "Shoplift" (2004)
 "Fatman and Littleboy" / "The Over Under" (2006)
 "Rock the Convoy" (2007)
 "All the Drugs (Do Nothing)" (2017)
 "Couple Skate" (2017)
 "JJ Sad" (2018)
 "Frankie (Can't Relax)" (2018)
 "Ithaca" (2018)
 "All the Drugs: Ohio Dirt Mix" (2018)
 "Bikini" (2019)
 "Boca Raton" (2020)

Productions
 Aesop Rock – "Winners Take All" from Fast Cars, Danger, Fire and Knives (2005)
 Aesop Rock – "Dark Heart News" from None Shall Pass (2007)

Guest appearances
 The Infesticons – "Chase Theme" from Gun Hill Road (2000)
 El-P – "Truancy" from Fantastic Damage (2002)
 Funkstörung – "Mr. Important" from Disconnected (2004)
 Hangar 18 – "One Night at the Bar" (2004)
 C-Rayz Walz – "Walk Through" from Year of the Beast (2005)
 Blue Sky Black Death – "Long Division" from A Heap of Broken Images (2006)
 El-P – "Flyentology" from I'll Sleep When You're Dead  (2007)
 Aesop Rock – "Dark Heart News" from None Shall Pass (2007)
 Tobacco – "Lick the Witch" from LA UTI (2010)
 Aesop Rock – "Dokken Rules" and "BMX" from Skelethon (2012)
 Illogic and Blockhead – "Nails" from Preparing for Capture (2012)
 Armand Hammer – "Post Haste" from Half Measures (2013)
 Onry Ozzborn – "Not Really" from Duo (2016)

Compilation appearances
 "F.U. for Failure Ugly" on Definitive Jux Presents II (2002)
 "Dylsexia" on Definitive Jux Presents III (2004)
 "Shoplift (El-P Remix)" on Definitive Jux Teaser 2005 (2005)
 "Brand New Vandals" on Definitive Swim (2007)
 "Domestic Animals" on Definitive Jux Presents IV (2009)

References

External links
 

American male rappers
Definitive Jux artists
Living people
Rappers from the Bronx
Year of birth missing (living people)
21st-century American rappers
21st-century American male musicians